High lead logging is a method of cable logging using a spar, yarder and loader. It was developed by Oscar Wirkkala.  It is accomplished with two lines (cables) and two winches (or cable drums).  The mainline or yarding line extends out from one winch, while a second usually lighter line called the haulback line extends out from the other winch to a 'tail block' or pulley at the tail (back) end of the logging site, and passes through the tail block and connects to the main line.   Butt rigging is installed where the two lines join and the logs are hooked to the butt rigging with chokers.  The procedure is to wind up the main line and the logs are pulled in, wind up the haulback and the butt rigging is pulled out for more logs or another 'turn'.

The "high lead" feature is added by elevating both lines near the winch or 'head' end.  This is accomplished by running the lines through a block (pulley) called the "head block" because it is on the head end of the project.  Early on, it was customary to trim and top a tree making it into a 'spar pole' or 'spar tree' for the purpose of supporting the head blocks but gradually the use of wooden spars gave way over the 20th century to the use of steel spars stood up for the purpose. In any event the spars are supported by a number of guy wires.

The reason for elevating the lines (cables) at the head end is to assist in pulling the logs free of obstructions on the ground.  Also if the trees are being partially lifted as they are transported it is less disruptive to the ground which can be an environmental issue.

High lead is a popular method of logging on the West Coast of America.

First used in 1904, with Lidgerwood winches, and a spar tree.

References

External links
 High-lead Logging on the Olympic Peninsula in the 1920s-30s

Log transport